This is a list of films which placed number-one at the South Korean box office during 2010, based on admissions.

Highest-grossing films

References

See also 
 List of South Korean films of 2010

2010 in South Korean cinema
2010
South Korea